The Boston Civic Symphony is the second oldest orchestra in Boston, Massachusetts.

History 

The Boston Civic Symphony was founded in 1924 by Joseph Wagner. The group performs at the New England Conservatory in Jordan Hall on Gainsborough Street.

References

External links
 Official Website
 Official YouTube Channel
Celebrating the 90th Season of Boston Civic Symphony

Musical groups established in 1924
Musical groups from Boston
Orchestras based in Massachusetts